Enyovche is a village in Ardino Municipality, Kardzhali Province, southern-central Bulgaria. It covers an area of 2.015 square kilometres and in 2007 had a population of 264.

References

Villages in Kardzhali Province